Vernon Gordon Petherick (20 April 1876 – 14 August 1945) was an Australian politician who represented the South Australian House of Assembly seat of Victoria from 1918 to 1924, 1932 to 1938 and 1941 to 1945 for the Liberal Union, Liberal Federation and Liberal and Country League.

See also
Hundred of Petherick

References

External links
Entry on Obituaries Australia

1876 births
1945 deaths
Members of the South Australian House of Assembly
Liberal and Country League politicians